Katërmbëdhjetë vjeç dhëndër (English: A Bridegroom at Fourteen) is an Albanian play by Andon Zako Çajupi. The four-act comedy was written in 1902 and published posthumously in 1930. The work, which was considered a critique on the custom of arranged marriage, was adapted to film in 1987.

References

Albanian literature
Arranged marriage in fiction